The 1932 United States presidential election in Illinois took place on November 8, 1932, as part of the 1932 United States presidential election. State voters chose 29 representatives, or electors, to the Electoral College, who voted for president and vice president.

Illinois was won by Governor Franklin D. Roosevelt (D–New York), running with Speaker John Nance Garner, with 55.23% of the popular vote, against incumbent President Herbert Hoover (R–California), running with Vice President Charles Curtis, with 42.04% of the popular vote.

This is the only occasion since at least the American Civil War that any Democratic Presidential candidate has ever carried Ford County or Stark County. , this is also the last occasion when Livingston County and Washington County have voted for a Democratic Presidential candidate.

Election information
The primaries and general elections coincided with those for other federal offices (Senate and House), as well as those for state offices.

Turnout
The total vote in the state-run primary elections (Democratic and Republican) was 939,189.

The total vote in the general election was 3,407,926.

Primaries
Both major parties held non-binding state-run preferential primaries on April 12.

Democratic

The 1932 Illinois Democratic presidential primary was held on April 12, 1932 in the U.S. state of Illinois as one of the Democratic Party's state primaries ahead of the 1932 presidential election.

The popular vote was a non-binding "beauty contest". Delegates were instead elected by direct votes by congressional district on delegate candidates.

The popular vote was near unanimously won by the only name on the ballot, U.S. Senator from Illinois J. Hamilton Lewis, who ran as a favorite son.

Republican

The 1932 Illinois Republican presidential primary was held on April 12, 1932 in the U.S. state of Illinois as one of the Republican Party's state primaries ahead of the 1932 presidential election.

The preference vote was a "beauty contest". Delegates were instead selected by direct-vote in each congressional districts on delegate candidates.

The popular vote was near unanimously won by the only name on the ballot, former U.S. Senator from Maryland Joseph I. France.

General election

Results

Results by county

See also
 United States presidential elections in Illinois

References

Illinois
1932
1932 Illinois elections